Ernest Hall (6 August 1916 – 7 July 1944) was a footballer who played in the Football League for Brighton & Hove Albion and Newcastle United.

Personal life
Hall served as a pilot officer in the Royal Air Force Volunteer Reserve during the Second World War, being promoted to that rank from sergeant on 28 February 1944. On 7 July 1944, he was killed in action piloting Vickers Wellington LP210 when the bomber was shot down during a bombing raid of Feuersbrunn aerodrome, near St. Pölten, Austria. Hall is buried at the Klagenfurt War Cemetery.

Career statistics
Source:

References

English footballers
Stoke City F.C. players
Newcastle United F.C. players
Brighton & Hove Albion F.C. players
English Football League players
1916 births
1944 deaths
Association football central defenders
Royal Air Force Volunteer Reserve personnel of World War II
Royal Air Force personnel killed in World War II
Royal Air Force officers
British World War II bomber pilots
Aviators killed by being shot down
Royal Air Force pilots of World War II